Nils Christie (24 February 1928 – 27 May 2015) was a Norwegian sociologist and criminologist. He was a professor of criminology at the Faculty of Law, University of Oslo.

Personal life
Christie was born in Oslo on 24 February 1928, a son of Ragnvald Christie and Ruth Hellum.

Career
Having passed examen artium at Berg Upper Secondary School in 1946, Christie graduated in sociology from the University of Oslo in 1953. His dr.philos. thesis Unge norske lovovertredere from 1959 is a comparison of all male lawbreakers born in 1933 in Norway to others born the same year. He was appointed at the Faculty of Law, University of Oslo from 1959, and was a professor of criminology at the faculty from 1966. Among his books is Pinens begrensning (Limits to Pain) from 1981, which has been translated into eleven languages. His work Fangevoktere i konsentrasjonsleire (Prison Guards in Concentration Camps, 1952) was selected for the Norwegian Sociology Canon in 2009–2011. He received an honorary degree from the University of Copenhagen. Christie is well known for his longstanding criticism of drug prohibition, industrial society, and prisons.

He was a member of the Norwegian Academy of Science and Letters.

Nils Christie was awarded the 2001 Fritt Ord Freedom of Expression Prize "for his original and independent contributions to the Norwegian and international social debate."

Select bibliography
Fangevoktere i konsentrasjonsleire (Prison Guards in Concentration Camps, 1952)
Hvis skolen ikke fantes (1971)
Pinens begrensning (1981)
Limits to Pain (1981)
Den gode fiende: Narkotikapolitikk i Norden (with Kettil Bruun, 1985)
Kriminalitetskontrol som industri: På vej mod GULAG, vestlig stil? (1996)
Crime Control as Industry: Towards GULAGs, Western Style? (2000)
En passende mengde kriminalitet (2004)
A Suitable Amount of Crime (2004)

See also

Christie's reaction to the Beisfjord Massacre

References

1928 births
2015 deaths
Norwegian criminologists
University of Oslo alumni
Academic staff of the Faculty of Law, University of Oslo
Members of the Norwegian Academy of Science and Letters
Prison abolitionists